The viola campaniça is a portuguese stringed musical instrument from Vila Verde de Ficalho, in the Serpa Municipality (South-eastern Portugal). It has 10 steel strings in 5 courses, tuned C3 C2, F3 F2, C3 C3, E3 E3, G3 G3.

The adjective campaniço (kump-ah-NEE-soo) means literally "from the countryside".

External links
 The Stringed Instrument Database 
 ATLAS of Plucked Instruments

String instruments
Portuguese musical instruments

pt:Violas portuguesas